Tony Bartlett (born 14 August 1955) is a British fencer. He competed in the team foil events at the 1988 and 1992 Summer Olympics.

References

External links
 

1955 births
Living people
British male fencers
Olympic fencers of Great Britain
Fencers at the 1988 Summer Olympics
Fencers at the 1992 Summer Olympics
Sportspeople from London